Constitución is a station on Line C of the Buenos Aires Underground and is the current terminus. Here passengers can transfer to Metrobus Sur. The station is a part of the larger Constitución railway station which serves as the terminal for the General Roca Railway and Roca Line. The station was opened on 9 November 1934 as part of the inaugural section of the line, from Constitución to Diagonal Norte.

Up until 1966, it also combined with Line E at a station of the same name, until line E was re-routed.

Gallery

References

External links

Buenos Aires Underground stations
Railway stations opened in 1934
1934 establishments in Argentina